Events in the year 2021 in Lebanon.

Incumbents
President: Michel Aoun 
Prime Minister:
Hassan Diab
Najib Mikati

Events
Ongoing – COVID-19 pandemic in Lebanon

January 
 January 25 – Protests and clashes in Tripoli erupt against nationwide COVID-19 lockdown measures.

February
 February 16 – An oil spill in the Mediterranean caused hundreds of tons of tar to wash up on beaches including environmentally sensitive areas such as the Tyre Coast Nature Reserve, an important nesting site for endangered sea turtles.

March 
 March 26 – The first 50,000 Sputnik V COVID-19 vaccine doses arrived in Lebanon, adding to the 224,640 Pfizer-BioNTech doses received over the previous six weeks.

May 
 May 13 – Three rockets launched from the Qlaileh region towards Israel, landing in the Mediterranean Sea. This comes amidst the 2021 Israel-Palestine crisis.
 May 14 – One person killed by Israeli fire during demonstrations along the Blue Line.
 May 17 – Six rockets fired from the Rachaya Al Foukhar area towards Israel, with all falling within Lebanon. In response, 22 shells were launched by the Israeli army towards the source.
 May 18 – Four rockets fired from Siddikine towards Israel, causing no damage.

July 
 July 15 – Lebanese Prime Minister Saad Hariri resigned from his position, further deepening the country's political crisis.

August 
 August 1
 Clashes reported in Khaldeh between Hezbollah supporters and a rival group killed at least 5 people.

 August 4 
 Lebanon marked one-year anniversary since the 2020 Beirut explosion which killed more than 200 people.
 Clashes reported in Beirut following Lebanon's anniversary of the 2020 explosion. Dozens of people reportedly injured. 
 August 5 – Israeli military launched air strikes in South Lebanon following rocket attacks from Hezbollah.
 August 9 – Fighting over fuel shortages across Lebanon caused the death of 3 people as Lebanon's economic crisis worsened.
 August 15 – At least 20 people killed and more than 7 injured after a fuel tanker exploded in Akkar District.

September 
 September 10 – Government of Lebanon announces a new cabinet formation, with the re-appointment of former Lebanese Prime Minister Najib Mikati as the country's prime minister.

October 
 October 9 – The country's two largest power stations shut down due to a fuel shortage resulting in a nationwide power cut.
 October 14 - 2021 Beirut clashes.

Deaths
 
4 January – Elias Rahbani, lyricist and composer (b. 1938).
4 February – Lokman Slim, publisher and political activist (born 1962).

References

 

 
2020s in Lebanon
Years of the 21st century in Lebanon
Lebanon
Lebanon